Begusarai railway station (code BGS) is a railway station in the  division of East Central Railway. Begusarai is better known as the Industrial Capital of Bihar, the birthplace of noted poet Rashtrakavi Ramdhari Singh Dinkar and karmabhoomi of the Great freedom fighter, first chief minister and architect of modern Bihar Dr. Shrikrishna Sinha alias Sri Babu.

The major facilities available are waiting rooms, computerized reservation facility and vehicle parking. The vehicles are allowed to enter the station premises. The station also has STD/ISD/PCO telephone booth, toilets, tea stalls, fruit stall, dairy stall, meal stall and book stall. The station has total three platforms and are interconnected with two foot over bridges. Several electrified local passenger trains and express trains run from Barauni Junction to neighbouring destinations such as Katihar, Munger, Saharsa, Purnia, New Jalpaiguri among others.

References

External links 
 Official website of Begusarai district

Railway stations in Begusarai district
Sonpur railway division
Begusarai